Sanderson Miller (1716 – 23 April 1780) was an English pioneer of Gothic revival architecture and landscape designer. He is noted for adding follies or other Picturesque garden buildings and features to the grounds of an estate.

Early life 
Miller was the son of a wool merchant of the same name, High Sheriff of Warwickshire in 1728, who died in 1737. He was born, lived and died at Radway, on the Warwickshire estate bought by his father in 1712.

At the age of 15, Miller was already interested in antiquarian subjects, and while studying at St Mary Hall, Oxford he continued to develop his interest in England's past, under the influence of William King. He inherited Radway Grange when he was 21, and a few years later started to redesign the Elizabethan house in a Gothic style. 

In the grounds he added a thatched cottage and octagonal tower based on Guy's Tower at Warwick Castle. The tower not only evoked the past visually through its medieval design but it also had strong historical associations of other kinds: for instance, it was intended to house a statue of Caractacus and was sited on the spot traditionally associated with the king raising the standard before the Battle of Edgehill.

Patronage and developments 

This work at Radway established Miller's reputation as a gentleman, or amateur, architect and landscape designer. His wide social circle, and contacts developed through his patron George Lyttelton, 1st Baron Lyttelton, led to many requests for his designs. He produced some classical buildings like the Shire Hall in Warwick and Hagley Hall, Worcestershire, but is more often associated with Gothic revival work, as at Albury Hall, Oxfordshire and the Great Hall at Lacock Abbey. He is especially known for the evocative mock "ruined" castles he created at Hagley, Wimpole Hall and Ingestre Hall, Staffordshire, though this last has since been demolished. Other places to which he contributed include Farnborough Hall, Wroxton Abbey, Upton House, Sham Castle, and Siston Court and Tudor Court, Hanworth Park, the surviving part of a Royal hunting lodge used by Henry VIII.

Family
Miller married Susanna, daughter of Edward Trotman and they had six children: Fiennes, Charles, Susanna, Mary, Hester and Anna.

Gallery of work

Notes

References

Sources
William Hawkes, The Diaries of Sanderson Miller (Dugdale 2005)

Further reading
Jennifer Meir, Sanderson Miller and his Landscapes (Phillimore 2006)
Michael Cousins, "Wroxton Abbey, Oxfordshire: an eighteenth-century estate", Follies Journal, no 5 (2005), pp. 39–72.
Michael Cousins, "The sham ruin, Hagley", Follies Magazine, vol. 10, no. 1 (1998), pp. 3–4.
Michael Cousins, "Lady Elizabeth's Grotto [Hagley]", Follies Magazine, #64, pp. 14–16.
Michael Cousins, "Hagley Park, Worcestershire", Garden History, vol. 35, Suppl. 1 (2007), pp. 1–152.

External links

British neoclassical architects
English landscape and garden designers
1716 births
1780 deaths
18th-century English architects
Architects from Warwickshire